The Saskatchewan Mining Development Corporation (SMDC) was a provincial crown corporation established in 1974 by the Government of Saskatchewan to manage the government's interests in exploration and mining in the province. It was active in the exploration for Uranium, Gold, and Diamonds.

In 1988, the assets of SMDC were merged with those of Eldorado Nuclear Limited, under the terms of The Saskatchewan Mining Development Corporation Reorganization Act, to form Cameco Corporation with its head office in Saskatoon, Saskatchewan.

References

External links 

The Saskatchewan Mining Development Corporation Reorganization Act -   HTML   PDF

Defunct mining companies of Canada
Former Crown corporations of Canada
Uranium mining companies of Canada